Marta Pagnini (born 21 January 1991) is a retired Italian group rhythmic gymnast from Prato, Italy.

Career 

She was part of the 2010 and 2011 Italian Group that competed at the World Championships that won the Group All-around gold medal. Her teammates also won a pair of bronze medals at the 2012 World Cup Final in 5 Balls and 3 Ribbons + 2 Hoops. She has won a bronze medal at the 2012 Summer Olympics in the group all-around event together with other Group Members( Elisa Blanchi, Romina Laurito, Elisa Santoni, Anzhelika Savrayuk, Andreea Stefanescu ). 
In 2013, with the retirement of Elisa Santoni, Pagnini became the captain of the Italian National Rhythmic Gymnastics Team that was dubbed "Le Leonesse".
In 2013, Pagnini was part of the team that took an all around silver and won a silver in 10 Clubs event in World Rhythmic Gymnastics Championships in Kiev. In 2014, Pagnini was part of the team that took an all around silver in World Rhythmic Gymnastics Championships in Izmir.  With her team, she competed at the 2015 European Games in Baku and finished 7th in all around group finals, 5th in 5 Ribbons event and 6th in 3 Clubs+2 Hoops event. In 2015, she and her team mates took gold in 5 Ribbons final at the 2015 World Rhythmic Gymnastics Championships in Stuttgart. She was the captain of the Italian National Rhythmic Gymnastics Team that competed at the 2016 Summer Olympics in the group all-around event. Pagnini and her team mates, Martina Centofanti, Sofia Lodi, Alessia Maurelli and Camilla Patriarca placed 4th with an overall score of 35,549 behind Bulgaria.
She is fluent in Russian and English and serves in the Italian Air Force as aviere capo

Detailed Olympic results

References

External links 

 
 
 
 
 

1991 births
Living people
Italian rhythmic gymnasts
Olympic gymnasts of Italy
Olympic bronze medalists for Italy
Olympic medalists in gymnastics
Gymnasts at the 2012 Summer Olympics
Medalists at the 2012 Summer Olympics
Gymnasts at the 2015 European Games
European Games competitors for Italy
Medalists at the Rhythmic Gymnastics World Championships
Medalists at the Rhythmic Gymnastics European Championships
Gymnasts of Centro Sportivo Aeronautica Militare